Leigh Academy Rainham is an 11–18 mixed secondary school and sixth form located in Rainham, Kent, England. Established in September 2021, it is a free school, and part of the Leigh Academies Trust.

Background
In 2016 Central government announced an initiative to relieve the school place pressure in Medway. The Education and Skills Funding Agency (ESFA) managed and determined the process. There were thirteen bids and the Leigh Academies Trust won the bid to build the 1150 place free school; it will be a non-selective school for students aged 11–19. (ISCED Levels 2–3). This will represent an additional capital investment of between 20–30 million pounds.

The Leigh Academies Trust runs 25 academies in the North Kent area incorporating many larger than average secondaries. In an interview a previous chief executive, Frank Green explained the small schools model of education as a way to prevent students from dropping out, and vertical tutor groups as a way that allows students to be supported by peers a couple of years their senior. The trust creates largely autonomous schools within the school- analogous to houses in former times. In its consultation documents for the proposed school, the small school model is mentioned. The Leigh Academies Trust is an enthusiastic proponent of the IB, (International Baccalaureate) adopting the Learner Profile, and offering an IB Middle Years Programme compliant curriculum within its secondary schools.

The school today
The school opened on the Otterham Quay Lane site in September 2021 with the first Year 7 cohort of 180 students and 45 staff. It will grow annually as more year groups join, reaching its capacity of 1150 students and 120 staff in September 2027. The Academy is a non-selective coeducational secondary setting, the only comprehensive school to offer places to boys and girls in Rainham. Pupils are not required to sit the Medway Test or a Fair Banding Test to apply for a place at the school.

The school delivers the MYP curriculum to its KS3 pupils which develops life long learning skills and promotes pupils to take an active role in structured inquiry when learning new content and skills. The MYP curriculum on offer exposes pupils to a variety of global contexts and brings real world issues into the classroom.

Site
Leigh Academy Rainham is situated on Otterham Quay Lane, on the eastern border of Rainham, following successful consultation and planning approval from Medway Council building works began and the school opened for September 2021. There is a single point of vehicular access from a roundabout on Otterham Quay Road. To reduce traffic there are 4 dedicated school buses, with a 140 space carpark for the staff and evening events.

Building
Bowmer + Kirkland were appointed as the construction partner, and employed CPMG Architects to design a standards compliant, sustainable building. It is a standard 3-storey (75m x 45m) block design with sports- facilities in a smaller attached single storey (33m x 18m) block.

The main 3 storey block has a figure eight like structure, being built around two internal courtyards or atriums. One houses the school hall and activity studio and is two storeys high- the other is larger and three storeys in height and is used as the dining area. The specialist teaching areas are around the hall and the general classrooms and staff rooms are around the dining atrium. The layout of the three floors here is identical, and are labelled on the plan as colleges.

References

External links 
 
 Project website

Secondary schools in Medway
Free schools in England
Leigh Academies Trust
Educational institutions established in 2021
2021 establishments in England